The 1960–61 Sheffield Shield season was the 59th season of the Sheffield Shield, the domestic first-class cricket competition of Australia. New South Wales won the championship for the eighth consecutive year.

Table

Statistics

Most Runs
Bill Lawry 813

Most Wickets
Des Hoare 30

References

Sheffield Shield
Sheffield Shield
Sheffield Shield seasons